Aduri, in Iran, may refer to:
 Aduri, Arzuiyeh (ادوري - Adūrī)
 Aduri, Bam (ادوري - Adūrī)
 Aduri, Faryab (آدورئ - Ādūrī)
 Aduri, Rabor (ادوري - Adūrī)